The 2008–09 Scottish Challenge Cup, known as the ALBA Challenge Cup due to sponsorship reasons with MG Alba, was the 18th season of the competition, competed for by all 30 members of the Scottish Football League. The defending champions were St Johnstone, who defeated Dunfermline Athletic by 3–2 in the 2007 final.

The competition was won by Airdrie United who defeated Ross County 3–2 on penalties following a 2–2 draw after extra time, the winning penalty was scored by Marc Smyth.

Schedule

First round
The First round draw was conducted on 29 May 2008. Holders St Johnstone were drawn against Ross County away from home.

North and East Region
Raith Rovers received a random bye to the second round.

Source:

South and West Region
Greenock Morton received a random bye to the second round.

Source:

Second round
The Second round draw was conducted on 30 July 2008.

Source:

Quarter-finals
The Quarter-final draw was conducted on 14 August 2008.

Semi-finals
The Semi-final draw was conducted on 11 September 2008.

Final

Media coverage
The Partick Thistle v Airdrie United semi-final was shown live and the final was shown live on BBC Alba.

References

External links
 BBC Scottish Cups page

Scottish Challenge Cup seasons
Challenge Cup
Scottish Challenge Cup, 2008-09